The 1992–93 season of the Czechoslovak First League was the last in which teams from the Czech Republic and Slovakia competed together. Peter Dubovský was the league's top scorer with 24 goals. The league was succeeded at the end of the season by the Czech First League and the Slovak Super Liga.

Overview
It was contested by 16 teams, and Sparta Prague won the championship. Czechoslovakia received one of the slots of UN banned Yugoslavia for the UEFA Cup. Brno was invited as Czech club to the Cup Winners Cup because the Cup of Czechoslovakia went to Slovakia and the loser finalist was Sparta Prague.

Stadia and locations

League standings

Results

Czech First League qualification play-off 

|}

Top goalscorers 
Flags indicate nationality after the dissolution of Czechoslovakia on 1 January 1993.

References

Czechoslovakia - List of final tables (RSSSF)

Czechoslovak First League seasons
Czech
1992–93 in Czechoslovak football